Matarsak (The Scarecrow) is a 1985 Iranian film, directed by Hassan Mohammadzadeh and written by Mehdi Ma'danian. The film was the first to win the Best Film prize at the Fajr Film Festival, which commenced after the Iranian Revolution. The performances of Mohammad Reza Morseli in a juvenile role and Jeyran Sharif in a supporting role received acclaim and awards.

References

Iranian drama films
1980s Persian-language films
1985 films
Crystal Simorgh for Best Film winners